Stan Smith won the singles title at the 1970 Pepsi-Cola Masters. He defeated runner-up Rod Laver, although both had achieved the same number of wins.

Round robin

Standings
Standings are determined by: 1. number of wins; 2. number of matches; 3. in two-players-ties, head-to-head records; 4. in three-players-ties, percentage of sets won, or of games won; 5. steering-committee decision.

See also
ATP World Tour Finals appearances

References

External links
 ATP Singles results

Singles